"Circles" is a song by the American band Atlantic Starr, and the first single released from their 1982 album Brilliance.  The single was the most successful for the group thus far, peaking at number two for two weeks on the Soul Singles chart and it also became their first single to hit the Billboard Hot 100, peaking at number 38.  "Circles" was also Atlantic Starr's most successful single on the dance charts, peaking at number nine.

Cover versions
In 1992, Nigerian singer Saffron recorded her version, which featured a remix by Frankie Knuckles, which charted at #60 in the UK.
In 1998, Kimara Lovelace went to number one on the dance play charts with her version of the song, becoming the most successful single of her career.

Chart positions

Atlantic Starr

Saffron

See also
List of number-one dance singles of 1998 (U.S.)
List of post-disco artists and songs

References

1982 songs
1982 singles
1997 singles
Atlantic Starr songs
A&M Records singles
Post-disco songs
Song recordings produced by James Anthony Carmichael